Bianca de la Garza (born October 13, 1975) is a Mexican-American  journalist, television personality, and founder of Bianca de la Garza Beauty. She has worked for various stations such as WCVB, ABC, and FOX.

Education 
De la Garza is an alumna of Emerson College.

Early career 
She began her television career in 1997 working for WTEN. In 2001, she became a news anchor at WFXT-TV. She created and is the host of BIANCA, which at its height has aired across 20 million homes in the U.S.

WTEN 
In 1997, just days after graduating cum laude from Emerson College, de la Garza was working full-time on-air at WTEN, the ABC affiliate in Albany, New York. She was hired by newsman Don Decker, then news director at WTEN, who recognized her potential and put her on-air in the major TV market 51. de la Garza there was covering all players in the state capital under Governor George Pataki's administration including Senate Majority leader Joe Bruno and former Speaker of the State Assembly Sheldon Silver, scoring interviews with, then candidates, Hillary Clinton and Charles Schumer both of whom would go on to win their elections.  De la Garza was first among the first on scene at the devastating F3 tornado in Mechanicville, New York May 31, 1998.

KGTV 
In 1999 de la Garza joined KGTV the ABC affiliate in San Diego as a reporter and fill-in anchor. Establishing herself as a border correspondent interviewing smugglers and migrants along the Tijuana border and the meetings of then California Governor Grey Davis speaking with Mexico President Vicente Fox.

She received an award from the San Diego press club for her investigative reports on an illegal factory she uncovered for smuggling undocumented workers across the US border and locking them up overnight at their facility. That factory was raided by federal agents and shut down. She reported on illegal immigration along the US-Mexico border and human trafficking.

De la Garza covered the deadly school shooting on March 5, 2001, at Santana High School in Santee California.  .

WFXT 
In 2001 de la Garza returned East joining WFXT, Boston FOX affiliate as a reporter and lead weekend anchor. During her time there she garnered 5 Emmy nominations. In 2004, 2005, and 2006 she was nominated for outstanding anchoring.

In December 2001, she followed the trial and conviction of the "Shoe Bomber" Richard Reid, a British terrorist who boarded American Airlines Flight 63 between Paris and Miami December 22, 2001. de la Garza reported live from the United Nations Headquarters in New York City on February 5, 2003, covering the weapons of mass destruction speech delivered by Colin Powell. She traveled to Rome for her coverage of the Catholic Church sexual abuse cases.

WCVB 
In 2007 de la Garza joined WCVB the ABC station in Boston. As the morning anchor, then adding noon show to her duties, her  newscasts consistently beat the competition in the Nielsen ratings. She was at the helm for major local and global stories from the capture of Osama Bin Laden to the Boston Marathon Bombing. Her exclusive interview with a survivor of the Craigslist killer Phillip Markoff was picked up nationally on ABC's Good Morning America and Inside Edition.

De la Garza received an Emmy nomination for her coverage of the Royal Wedding of Prince William and Kate Middleton in England. There she scored a world exclusive interview with Mohammed Al-Fayed in London, who gave candid remarks about his beliefs that the Royal Family was involved in the death of Princess Diana and his son Dodi. De la Garza covered several Super bowls and World Series playoffs over a span of several years in Boston. She and her team joined Red Sox Player David Ortiz in commercials promoting Good Morning America.

Movies and TV shows 
De la Garza was guest on the Wendy Williams show. She had a cameo on the hit NBC TV show American Odyssey and a co-hosting guest spot on Hollywood Today Live with Ross Matthews.

BIANCA 
De la Garza announced she would be leaving news media to start her own production company in 2014. Later that year she teamed up with Sony and Embassy Row Productions to produce a late night talk show to air in New England. Alongside Embassy Row CEO Michael Davies in December 2014. It was announced the show would tape in front of a live audience in their Manhattan studios. She signed a distribution deal with several Hearst Affiliates in New England to carry the show on Saturday night at 11:30pm. She secured advertising partner Dunkin Donuts as a launch sponsor. The show premiered January 24 in 2015 on ABC stations making her the first woman in late night in decades. Her guests included Slash from Guns and Roses and Dancing with the Star's Tom Bergeron. One month after premiering The Wrap featured the fast newcomer ratings success as a second only to Saturday Night Live stating “after four weeks, the new entry into the landscape has proven to be a ratings success”. Davies stated “what Bianca has done is unprecedented.”

In June 2015, it was announced that the show had been picked up by CBS and CW affiliates nationwide.

The second season featured guests like actress Elizabeth Hurley and the last television interviews of writer Jackie Collins before her death. Despite talks to move the show into a daytime time slot the show wrapped in fall of 2015. De la Garza was nominated for three Emmys in the categories of outstanding program host, outstanding promotional spot and outstanding lifestyle program.

Beauty and Bubbles with Bianca de la Garza 
In 2019 de la Garza created a series on the careers of those in the beauty and personal care industry, where  celebrity stylists, manicurists and estheticians revealed  t how they worked with their A list clientele. The show ran in 12 million homes in the U.S. on NBC Universal from 2019 to 2020.

NewsMax 
In 2021, de la Garza appeared as a guest host on Newsmax, and in January 2022, she announced she will co-anchor a midday show, John Bachman Now.

Business with Richard Hajjar 
De la Garza met Richard Hajjar, then CFO of the Alden Shoe Company, at a 2012 party at Bill Belichick’s house and the two were a fixture on the Nantucket social scene for several years; De la Garza has repeatedly denied any romantic involvement. Hajjar funded several of her business ventures, beginning with the Bianca Unanchored show in 2014. After the show failed commercially, Hajjar funded a skin-care line and Garza Digital. He ultimately transferred about 17 million dollars to de la Garza and her businesses. On 5 May 2021, Hajjar pled guilty to embezzlement of 30 million dollars from Alden, and by July 2021, Hajjar had returned about 5 million dollars to Alden. de la Garza was sued by Alden and reached a confidential settlement in which it appears she will return the small amount left after the money was spent on the business ventures.

Personal life 
De la Garza met newscaster David Wade when they worked in Albany, New York for competing stations. They married and then had a daughter in 2005. In 2009, de la Garza and Wade announced the end of their marriage.

References

External links 
 
 
 YouTube

ABC News personalities
American television reporters and correspondents
Emerson College alumni
20th-century American journalists
21st-century American journalists
1975 births
Living people